Mind Control is the third studio album by the English band Uncle Acid & the Deadbeats, released in the United Kingdom on 12 April 2013 and in North America on 14 May 2014. Following its release, the band toured with Black Sabbath in Europe.

Reception

Mind Control received positive reviews from critics.

Track listing
All songs written by Kevin Starrs.

Personnel
Personnel adapted from liner notes.
Uncle Acid & the Deadbeats
 Kevin Starrs – vocals, lead guitar
 Yotam Rubinger – vocals, guitar
 Dean Millar – bass guitar
 Thomas Mowforth – drums

Technical personnel
 Kevin Starrs – production, artwork
 Jim Spencer – engineering
 Fran Wheeldon – engineering
 Noel Summerville – mastering
 Ygor Lugosi – artwork

References

2013 albums
Uncle Acid & the Deadbeats albums
Rise Above Records albums